Ethernet VPN (EVPN) is a technology for carrying layer 2 Ethernet traffic as a virtual private network using wide area network protocols. EVPN technologies include Ethernet over MPLS and Ethernet over VXLAN.

EVPNs are covered by a number of Internet RFCs, including:
  "Requirements for Ethernet VPN (EVPN)", 
  "BGP MPLS-Based Ethernet VPN",
  "A Network Virtualization Overlay Solution Using Ethernet VPN (EVPN)",
  "Ethernet-Tree (E-Tree) Support in Ethernet VPN (EVPN) and Provider Backbone Bridging EVPN (PBB-EVPN)".

References

See also 
 Virtual Private LAN Service

Ethernet
Tunneling protocols